The lesser cuckoo (Cuculus poliocephalus) is a species of cuckoo in the family Cuculidae.

It is found in Bangladesh, Bhutan, China, Democratic Republic of the Congo, Hong Kong, India, Japan, Kenya, North Korea, South Korea, Laos, Malawi, Myanmar, Nepal, Pakistan, Russia, Seychelles, Somalia, South Africa, Sri Lanka, Tanzania, Thailand, Vietnam, Zambia, and Zimbabwe.

In culture

In Japan, the bird is called  and frequently praised for its song.

It has been celebrated by numerous waka poets since the anthology Kokin wakashū (920). Sei Shōnagon in her essay The Pillow Book (1002) mentions a trip she and other courtiers mounted on just to hear this bird, and it was expected of them that they would compose poetry on the occasion. It is also the central image in poem 81 by Tokudaiji Sanesada in the anthology of 100 poems, the Hyakunin Isshu .

The Japanese haiku magazine Hototogisu takes its name from the bird, and the magazine's mastermind Masaoka Shiki's adopted pen name,  also refers to the lesser cuckoo; shiki corresponds to the Chinese zǐguī, which is an alias for its standard name dùjuān (杜鵑).

In Chinese dùjuān is a generic name and the species' common name is xiāodùjuān.

In Korean literature, the song of the lesser cuckoo represents the sound of sadness.

References

lesser cuckoo
Birds of the Himalayas
Birds of East Asia
Birds of Africa
lesser cuckoo
Taxonomy articles created by Polbot